Kimberly Michelle Pate (born March 4, 1982) is an American singer and television personality. She is best known for appearing as a regular cast member on the VH1 reality television series Love & Hip Hop: Atlanta  during its first two seasons. Michelle subsequently signed with Atlantic Records. Her debut studio album, Rebellious Soul, debuted at number two on the US Billboard 200, and number one on the US Top R&B/Hip-Hop Albums charts. Her second studio album Anybody Wanna Buy a Heart? was released on December 9, 2014. The album debuted at eight six in the US and spawned three singles "Love 'Em All", "Maybe I Should Call" and "Hard to Do". The album sold 87,000 copies in its first week in sales.

In March 2016, Michelle's third studio album, More Issues Than Vogue, was released to positive reviews. Singles from the album included "Not a Little Bit" and "Ain't You". Her fourth album, Kimberly: The People I Used to Know was released on December 8, 2017 and debuted at the top ten of the Billboards Top R&B/Hip-Hop Albums chart. Her fifth  studio album, All Monsters Are Human was released on January 31, 2020. The album was preceded by two singles "Supahood" and "The Rain".

She has also starred in reality series Love & Hip Hop: New York, K. Michelle: My Life and Love & Hip Hop: Hollywood (under the name Kimberly), as well as in her own special, The Rebellious Soul Musical, directed by Golden Globe winner Idris Elba. Throughout her career, Michelle has received four BET Awards nominations. She won a Soul Train Music Awards and a NAACP Image Awards in 2013 and 2014. She was also honored with an ASCAP Women Behind the Music award in 2015.

Early life
Kimberly Michelle Pate was born on March 4, 1982, in Memphis, Tennessee. As a child, Michelle learned to play piano and guitar, and took voice lessons from Bob Westbrook, who also trained pop singers Justin Timberlake and Britney Spears. She graduated from Overton High School in Memphis in 2000. She earned a music scholarship to Florida A&M University (FAMU) by yodeling at her audition. She was crowned the Freshman Attendant of the Homecoming Court at the age of 18. She is a member of Delta Sigma Theta Sorority Incorporated, pledging Beta Alpha chapter Fall of 2001. She reports that she stopped attending classes for a short time to have a son born in September 2004, then returned to finish college. She graduated from FAMU with honors and was accepted into several law schools but did not attend, opting to pursue music full-time.

Michelle's age was reported in her college yearbook as 18 in late 2000, which would put her birth year at 1982. Her age was reported as 31 in 2015 by The Source magazine, which would put her birth year at 1984. AllMusic's biography of her initially gave a birth year of 1986, then in 2022 reported only “1980s”, but in 2023 the year was changed to 1982. Michelle gave 1986 in a 2013 interview. The editor of "GossipWeLove.com" commented on the discrepancies in reported birth year, registering disbelief that Michelle could have entered college, and won her class's prom beauty contest, at age 14. Michelle formed a college friendship with Basketball Wives actress Royce Reed who was born in 1981.

Career

2009–2011: Beginnings
In 2009, Michelle signed a deal with Jive Records and released her first R&B-charting single, "Fakin' It", featuring Missy Elliott. The song peaked at number 100 on the U.S. Hot R&B/Hip-Hop Songs. During 2010, Michelle released three follow-up singles, "Fallin'", "I Just Can't Do This" and "How Many Times", which charted at numbers 56, 53, and 53 respectively on the U.S. Hot R&B/Hip-Hop Songs chart. At the time, Michelle was in the process of recording her debut album, originally titled Pain Medicine, which was slated to have features from artists such as Trina, Gucci Mane, Akon, Usher, and R. Kelly, who she would credit as her mentor during this period. However, her album was scrapped when Jive Records folded in 2011.

2012–2014: Rebellious Soul, Anybody Wanna Buy a Heart?

In 2012, Michelle joined the cast of VH1's docu-soap Love & Hip Hop: Atlanta. The first season chronicles her return to the music industry after several personal struggles, including an abusive relationship with a music executive. K was dubbed the show's breakout star, signing a multi-album record deal with Atlantic Records shortly after filming. She returned to the show for a second season, which chronicled the recording of her debut studio album, Rebellious Soul. On May 20, 2013, she released the album's lead single, titled "V.S.O.P". The track was produced by Pop & Oak, and samples "Very Special", performed by Debra Laws, as well as "That's How Long" performed by The Chi-Lites. "V.S.O.P." reached at number 89 on the US Hot 100 Singles and number 27 on the US Billboard Hot R&B/Hip-Hop Songs charts. Its music video, directed by Benny Boom, was released on June 29, 2013. Rebellious Soul was released on August 13, 2013, debuting at number 2 on the U.S. Billboard 200 and number one on the U.S. Top R&B/Hip-Hop Albums charts, with first-week sales of 72,000 copies in the United States. As of December 2014, Rebellious Soul has sold over 260,000 copies.

On November 4, 2013, K. Michelle headlined her first tour, The Rebellious Soul Tour, presented by BET Music Matters. The 19 city tour kicked off in San Francisco and ended December 3, 2013 in Boston. It included stops in Los Angeles, Houston, Chicago, and Atlanta. Opening acts featured Chris Brown protégé Sevyn Streeter and Tiara Thomas. On January 14, 2014, the album's second single "Can't Raise a Man" was released, which peaked at number 94 on the U.S. Billboard Hot 100 and number 23 on the Hot R&B/Hip-Hop Songs charts.

During Love & Hip Hop: Atlantas reunion special, K. Michelle announced that she was leaving the show to join the cast of Love & Hip Hop: New York in season four. During this time, Michelle joined Robin Thicke on the North American leg of his Blurred Lines Tour, which began on February 21, 2014, in Atlanta, Georgia. On February 14, 2014, she released a mixtape project titled Still No Fucks Given. K's purpose on Love & Hop: New York was mainly served to set up her own spin-off series, K. Michelle: My Life, which premiered November 3, 2014.

On September 16, 2014, Michelle released "Love 'Em All" on iTunes as the first single from her second album Anybody Wanna Buy a Heart?. Kevin, editor-in-chief of Spin Media website Direct Lyrics, described "Love 'Em All" as a "powerful and gritty" song and a "heartbreaker anthem". On November 17, 2014, Michelle released "How Do You Know?" as her third single from Anybody Wanna Buy a Heart?, which shot to number one on the iTunes R&B chart. Michelle announced that she would go on a joint tour with Keyshia Cole beginning in January 2015. Anybody Wanna Buy a Heart? was released through Atlantic Records on December 9, 2014. The album debuted at number four on the Billboard 200 chart, number one on the Top R&B/Hip-Hop chart and number one on the R&B chart, selling 87,000 copies in the first week of its release. Although Anybody Wanna Buy a Heart? charted lower than Rebellious Soul, it topped Rebellious Souls first-week sales. In its second week, the album sold 30,000 copies, bringing its sales to around 120,000 copies. As of June 2015, Anybody Wanna Buy a Heart? has sold over 230,000 copies. Rebellious Soul and Anybody Wanna Buy a Heart? have sold 500,000 copies worldwide.

2015–2017: More Issues Than Vogue, Kimberly: The People I Used to Know
On January 21, 2016, K. Michelle released the single "Not a Little Bit" from her third studio album More Issues Than Vogue. From February 11, 2016, Michelle released several promo singles from the album, including "Ain't You", "Mindful" and "Time".  On February 12, 2016, More Issues Than Vogue was made available for pre-order before its official release on March 25, 2016. After making guest appearances in seasons three and four of Love & Hip Hop: Atlanta, K. Michelle would rejoin the main cast in season five, which chronicled her return to Atlanta and the release of her third album, More Issues Than Vogue.

Michelle toured for a month from July 14, 2016, to August 14, 2016 for her Hello Kimberly Tour. On September 30, 2016, Michelle released "Forward", from the soundtrack to the film "The Birth of a Nation".

On February 3, 2017, Michelle released the single "Got Me Crazy", alongside DJ Feezy, Rick Ross and Fabolous. On February 6, 2017, K. Michelle: My Life ended after three seasons. On September 8, 2017, Michelle released two singles from her fourth album Kimberly: The People I Used to Know, "Birthday" and "Either Way", featuring Chris Brown.

On December 7, 2017, Michelle released Kimberly: The People I Used to Know, which would be her final album with Atlantic Records.

2018–present: All Monsters Are Human

In 2018, K. Michelle joined the cast of Love & Hip Hop: Hollywood in season five, making her the only person in the franchise's history to appear in three incarnations of Love & Hip Hop as a main cast member. Michelle announced that her next project will be titled FAB, an acronym for "Fuck All U Bitches". On November 19, 2018, Michelle released the song "Save Me". It was later announced that she had signed a new record deal with Entertainment One Music.

In 2019, K. Michelle also appeared in the Love & Hip Hop clip show specials Love & Hip Hop Awards: Most Certified (where she won the Clapback Queens category) and 40 Greatest Love & Hip Hop Moments: The Reboot. In November 2019, during one of her O.S.D. Tour stops, Michelle announced the title of her fifth album, All Monsters Are Human, set to be released in January 2020. On January 1, 2020, Michelle released her sixth mixtape Not 1 Fuck Given (which also marks her third body of work from her 0 Fucks Given series). On the same day, she shared a lengthy message to her supporters on Instagram where she called her fifth album a "masterpiece." She wrote, "Where do I begin? Well first I just want to say thank you for loving on me. The last two years have been a real journey and growing experience for me. I literally was fighting for my life. I know I've had you guys waiting for my album so I wanted to give you something to vibe to until then. You know for years now we've had fun together remixing my favorite songs." On January 10, she revealed cover art and tracklist for All Monsters Are Human and made the album available for pre-order on digital retailers Apple Music and Amazon.

All Monsters Are Human was released to positive critical reviews on January 31, 2020, along with a music video for one of the songs from the album, "Just Like Jay". The album debuted and peaked at number 51 on the US Billboard 200 with first week sales of 8,200 copies.

K. Michelle has confirmed that her sixth studio album, I'm The Problem, will be released in 2022. It will mark her final R&B album. The first single is expected to release in February 2022. She has also been teasing her long-awaited country album, which expected to drop after her final R&B album.

Discography

 Rebellious Soul (2013)
 Anybody Wanna Buy a Heart? (2014)
 More Issues Than Vogue (2016)
 Kimberly: The People I Used to Know (2017)
 All Monsters Are Human (2020)
  I'm the Problem (2023)

ToursHeadlining Rebellious Soul Tour (2013)
 My Twisted Mind Tour (2015) 
 Hello Kimberly Tour (2016)
 The People I Used to Know Tour (2018)
 O.S.D. Tour (2019)
 I’m The Problem Tour (2023)Supporting'
 Ladies Make Some Noise Tour (supporting R. Kelly) (2009)
 Blurred Lines Tour (supporting Robin Thicke) (2014)

Awards and nominations

Filmography

References

External links

 
 

 
Age controversies
African-American women singers
American contemporary R&B singers
Atlantic Records artists
Florida A&M University alumni
Living people
Jive Records artists
Singers from Tennessee
People from Memphis, Tennessee
Delta Sigma Theta members
21st-century American singers
Participants in American reality television series
21st-century American women singers
African-American television personalities
American women television personalities
American hip hop singers
American women hip hop singers
1982 births
American mezzo-sopranos